The 2001–02 Sunshine Tour was the second season of professional golf tournaments since the southern Africa based Sunshine Tour was rebranded in 2000.  The Sunshine Tour represents the highest level of competition for male professional golfers in the region.

There were 22 official events on the schedule. This was an decrease of one from the previous year, but there was a significant change in the list of tournaments. 

There were eight tournaments from the previous season that were eliminated or not played:
Riviera Resort Classic
Vodacom Series: Eastern Cape
Vodacom Series: Gauteng
Emfuleni Classic
Ernie Els Invitational
Observatory Classic
Lombard Tyres Classic
Royal Swazi Sun Open (which resumed in 2003)

There were seven tournaments added for this season:
Goldfields Powerade Classic (played in 2001 only)
Blomfontein Classic (first time played since 1995; not played after this season)
Randfontein Classic (played in 2001 only)
Atlantic Beach Classic (played in 2001 only)
Graceland Challenge (played in 2001 only)
Vodacom Trophy (played one more time, as the Vodacom Golf Classic in 2002)
Royal Swazi Sun Classic (played 2001–04)

The tour was based predominantly in South Africa, with 17 of the 22 official tournaments being held in the country. One event each was held in Botswana, Swaziland, and Zimbabwe and two in Zambia.  Two events, the Dunhill Championship and the South African Airways Open were co-sanctioned by the European Tour.

As usual, the tour consisted of two distinct parts, commonly referred to as the "Summer Swing" and "Winter Swing". Tournaments held during the Summer Swing generally had much higher prize funds, attracted stronger fields, and were the only tournaments on the tour to carry world ranking points.

The Order of Merit was won by Tim Clark.

Schedule 
The following table lists official events during the 2001–02 season.

Order of Merit 
The Order of Merit was based on prize money won during the season, calculated in South African rand.

Notes

References

External links 

Sunshine Tour
Sunshine Tour
Sunshine Tour